Chapala Chennigaraya (Kannada: ಚಪಲ ಚೆನ್ನಿಗರಾಯ) is a 1990 Indian Kannada film, directed by H. R. Bhargava and produced by M Rajagopal and Suresh Kumar. The film stars Kashinath, Kalpana, Vanitha Vasu and Sundar Krishna Urs. The film had musical score by Rajan–Nagendra. The film was a remake of Tamil film Chinna Veedu.

Cast

Kashinath
Kalpana
Vanitha Vasu
Sundar Krishna Urs
Shimoga Venkatesh
Suresh Kumar
M. S. Karanth
Shani Mahadevappa
Bangalore Nagesh
Arvind
Kunigal Nagabhushan
Dingri Nagaraj
Bemel Somanna
Srishailan
Janardhan
Master Jeevan Prakash
Abhijith
Rathnakar
Janaki
M. N. Lakshmidevi
Gayathri Prabhakar
Sujatha

References

External links

1990 films
1990s Kannada-language films
Films scored by Rajan–Nagendra
Kannada remakes of Tamil films
Films directed by H. R. Bhargava